is a city in Wakayama Prefecture, Japan. , the city had an estimated population of 60,592 in 26652 households and a population density of 270 persons per km².

Geography
Kinokawa is located on the northern border of Wakayama Prefecture with Osaka Prefecture and the Izumi Mountains to the north and the Kii Mountains to the south. The Kinokawa River, after which the city is named, runs through the city from east to west.

Neighboring municipalities
Wakayama Prefecture
Wakayama (city)
Kainan
Iwade
Kimino
Katsuragi
Osaka Prefecture
Sennan
Izumisano
Kaizuka
Kishiwada

Climate
Kinokawa has a Humid subtropical climate (Köppen Cfa) characterized by warm summers and cool winters with light to no snowfall.  The average annual temperature in Kinokawa is 14.4 °C. The average annual rainfall is 1713 mm with September as the wettest month. The temperatures are highest on average in August, at around 26.0 °C, and lowest in January, at around 3.2 °C.

Demographics
Per Japanese census data, the population of Kinokawa has remained relatively steady over the past 60 years.

History
The area of the modern city of Kinokawa was within ancient Kii Province.  After the Meiji restoration, the area became was organized into 36 villages within Naga District, Wakayama with the creation of the modern municipalities system on April 1, 1889. Kokawa was raised to town status on November 10, 1894, and Kishigawa on March 31, 1955 and Naga on July 1, 1955. The towns of 
Momoyama,  and Uchita were established in 1956,

The modern city of Kinokawa was established on November 11, 2005, from the merger of the five towns of Kokawa, Kishigawa, Naga, Momoyama and Uchita.

Government
Kinokawa has a mayor-council form of government with a directly elected mayor and a unicameral city council of 22 members. Kinokawa contributes three members to the Wakayama Prefectural Assembly. In terms of national politics, the city is part of Wakayama 2nd district of the lower house of the Diet of Japan.

Economy
Kinokawa has a mixed economy. Agriculture, particularly horticulture remains a very strong component and is the major employer. Light and medium industries, particularly electronics and IT-related industries, have been attracted to the area due to its proximity to the Hanshin urban area.

Education
Kinokawa has 16 public elementary schools and seven public middle schools operated by the city government and two public high schools operated by the Wakayama Prefectural Department of Education. Kinki University's Biology-Oriented Science and Technology Institute is located in Kinokawa.

Transportation

Railway
 JR West – Wakayama Line
  -  -  -   - 
 Wakayama Electric Railway – Kishigawa Line
  -  -  -

Highway
  Keinawa Expressway

Local attractions 
Kokawa-dera, No.3 of the Saigoku Kannon Pilgrimage
Former Nate-juku Honjin, National Historic Site
Kii Kokubun-ji ruins, National Historic Site
 Kishi Station and station mascot Tama a calico cat.

Notable people from Kinokawa
 Naoya Masuda, baseball pitcher
 Hanaoka Seishū, surgeon of the Edo period
 Midori Shintani, judo wrestler
 Ryumon Yasuda, painter and sculptor

References

External links

  

 
Cities in Wakayama Prefecture